Strophanthus divaricatus is a liana or sarmentose shrub that can grow up to  tall, with a trunk diameter of up to . Divaricatus is from the Latin meaning "spreading at a wide angle". The plant has been used medicinally: as a heart stimulant and in the treatment of snakebites. It is native to southern China and northern Vietnam.

References

divaricatus
Plants used in traditional African medicine
Flora of China
Flora of Vietnam
Plants described in 1790